The 2017 Rakuten Japan Open Tennis Championships was a men's tennis tournament played on outdoor hard courts. It was the 44th edition of the Japan Open, and part of the 500 Series of the 2017 ATP World Tour. It was held at the Ariake Coliseum in Tokyo, Japan, from October 2–8, 2017.

Points and prize money

Point distribution

Prize money

Singles main-draw entrants

Seeds

 1 Rankings are as of September 25, 2017.

Other entrants
The following players received wildcards into the singles main draw:
  Taro Daniel
  Go Soeda 
  Yasutaka Uchiyama

The following player received entry as a special exempt:
  Alexandr Dolgopolov

The following players received entry from the qualifying draw:
  Matthew Ebden
  Franko Škugor
  Yusuke Takahashi
  Stefanos Tsitsipas

Withdrawals
Before the tournament
  Chung Hyeon →replaced by  Donald Young
  Gaël Monfils →replaced by  Jiří Veselý
  Gilles Müller →replaced by  Daniil Medvedev

Retirements
  Milos Raonic
  Benoît Paire

Doubles main-draw entrants

Seeds

 Rankings are as of September 25, 2017

Other entrants
The following pairs received wildcards into the doubles main draw:
  Toshihide Matsui /  Yūichi Sugita 
  Ben McLachlan /  Yasutaka Uchiyama

The following pair received entry from the qualifying draw:
  Treat Huey /  Adil Shamasdin

Finals

Singles

  David Goffin defeated  Adrian Mannarino, 6–3, 7–5

Doubles

  Ben McLachlan /  Yasutaka Uchiyama defeated  Jamie Murray /  Bruno Soares, 6–4, 7–6(7–1)

References

External links 
 

Rakuten Japan Open Tennis Championships
Japan Open (tennis)
 
Rakuten Japan Open Tennis Championships
Japan Open